Guido Gabriel Herrera (born 29 February 1992) is an Argentine professional footballer who plays as a goalkeeper for Talleres.

Club career
Herrera first played for Deportivo Río Cuarto at youth level, before joining Belgrano. His senior career got underway with the latter, he was moved into the first-team in 2012 and remained for two seasons but failed to make an appearance. In June 2013, Herrera left Belgrano to play for  Defensores de Belgrano of Torneo Argentino A. He made his debut for the club on 24 August 2014 against Alvarado. After fifty-two appearances in all competitions for Defensores de Belgrano over 2014 and 2015, Herrera completed a move to Primera B Nacional side Talleres on 7 January 2016.

He subsequently made his first appearance in professional football on 9 April versus Almagro, in a season which ended with promotion to the Argentine Primera División. In the club's final match of the 2018–19 campaign, Herrera scored for the first time; netting a penalty in a 2–2 draw with Olimpo on 12 May 2018 as Talleres qualified for the 2019 Copa Libertadores. After one hundred and twenty-six games, Herrera headed to Turkey with Yeni Malatyaspor on loan in August 2020. He made his debut on 12 September in a three-goal loss away to Fatih Karagümrük. His loan was terminated on 20 December.

International career
Herrera received a call-up to the Argentina national team in October 2018, replacing an injured Franco Armani for friendlies in Saudi Arabia with Iraq and Brazil.

Career statistics
.

Honours
Talleres
Primera B Nacional: 2016

References

External links

1992 births
Living people
People from Río Cuarto, Córdoba
Argentine footballers
Association football goalkeepers
Argentine Primera División players
Torneo Argentino A players
Torneo Federal A players
Primera Nacional players
Süper Lig players
Club Atlético Belgrano footballers
Defensores de Belgrano de Villa Ramallo players
Talleres de Córdoba footballers
Yeni Malatyaspor footballers
Argentine expatriate footballers
Argentine expatriate sportspeople in Turkey
Expatriate footballers in Turkey
Sportspeople from Córdoba Province, Argentina